Creobota is a genus of snout moths. It was described by Turner in 1931, and is known from Australia.

Species
 Creobota apodectum
 Creobota grossipunctella (Ragonot, 1888)

References

Phycitini
Pyralidae genera